Frederick Chapman (13 February 1864 – 10 December 1943) was the inaugural Australian Commonwealth Palaeontologist.

Early life
Chapman was born in Camden Town, London, England and studied at Royal College of Science, London where he was initially an assistant to John Wesley Judd. Chapman qualified as a teacher of geology and physiography at the college and was encouraged by Judd's study of boring samples from around London. He published Foraminifera. An Introduction to the Study of the Protozoa (London, 1902) and went on to become a world authority on Foraminifera.

Career in Australia
Chapman was Palaeontologist to the National Museum, Melbourne, Australia from 1902 to 1927. He published papers on the collection of fossils stored there including sponges, corals and fishes. He then served as the first Australian Commonwealth Palaeontologist 1927-35, where Irene Crespin was his assistant and later succeeded him.

Chapman was awarded the Lyell Prize for research by the Geological Society of London in 1899; the David Syme Research Prize of the University of Melbourne in 1920; the Lyell Medal, Geological Society, London 1930; the Clarke Medal by the Royal Society of New South Wales in 1932; the Australian Natural History Medallion by the Field Naturalists Club of Victoria in 1941. He was president of the Royal Society of Victoria 1929 to 1930. Chapman published Book of Fossils (London and Sydney) in 1934.

Family
Chapman married Helen Mary Dancer on 12 August 1890. Helen died in 1940. Frederick died on 10 December 1943 and was survived by a son, Wilfrid, and one daughter Winifred. Another daughter, Dora was a nurse who died of influenza in the great epidemic.

Bibliography 

 (1902) The Foraminifera. An Introduction to the Study of the Protozoa. London.
 Chapman F. (1905). "On some Foraminifera and Ostracoda obtained off Great Barrier Island, New Zealand". Transactions and Proceedings of the New Zealand Institute 38, 77-112.
 Chapman F. (1911). "New or Little Known Victorian Fossils in the National Museum." Proceedings of the Royal Society of Victoria, Melbourne 23: 305-324. plate 58-61.
 (1914) Australian Fossils. Melbourne, Sydney, Adelaide, Brisbane and London. Project Gutenberg eBook 59074
 (1934) Book of Fossils. London and Sydney.
 Chapman F. (1935). "On some Phyllocarids from the Ordovician of Preservation Inlet and Cape Providence, New Zealand". Transactions and Proceedings of the Royal Society of New Zealand 64 105-114.
 Chapman F. (1935). "Descriptions of Fossil Fish from New Zealand". Transactions and Proceedings of the Royal Society of New Zealand 64 117-121.
 In this work he described ray-finned fishes new genus Eothyrsites, Eothyrsites holosquamatus, Portheus dunedinensis.

References

Further reading 
 Linnean Society (London), Proceedings, 1943–44, pt 3
 Herald (Melbourne), 13 December 1943.
 W. N. B. (probably Benson, W. N.) (1944–1945). "Obituary. Frederick Chapman, Hon. F.R.S.N.Z." Transactions and Proceedings of the Royal Society of New Zealand 74: 302-303.
Chapman, Frederick (1864 - 1943) at Bright Sparcs, Melbourne University
Irene Crespin, 'Chapman, Frederick (1864 - 1943)', Australian Dictionary of Biography, Volume 7, MUP, 1979, p. 612.

1864 births
1943 deaths
Australian paleontologists
People from Camden Town
Lyell Medal winners